The Bel Group (a.k.a. Groupe Bel or Fromageries Bel in French) is a multinational cheese marketer centered in France.

Overview
The Bel Group is headquartered at 2 allée de Longchamp in Suresnes (near Paris). It manufactures and distributes processed and semi processed cheeses, frequently packaged in individual portions. The company “Établissements Jules Bel” was founded in 1865 in Orgelet in the Department of the Jura. The Laughing Cow, Babybel, Kiri, Leerdammer and Boursin are Bel's five core brands that are distributed on five continents.

As of 2015, the Bel Group is established in thirty three countries, and its products are sold in 130 countries.

History
The company was founded in 1865 by Jules Bel, under the name of Établissements Jules Bel in Orgelet.

By 1921, his son Léon Bel registered the La vache qui rit brand. Eight years later, in 1929, he created its first subsidiary in the United Kingdom. By 1933, another subsidiary was established in Belgium. In 1947, the Bonbel brand was launched. Three years later, in 1950, the company acquired Port Salut, which had been founded in 1816. By 1952, it launched Babybel. A new subsidiary was established in Germany in 1959.

Six years later, in 1965, another subsidiary was established in Spain; it would later become known as Bel España. (Bel Spain). The Kiri brand was launched in 1966. Meanwhile, a year later, in 1967, another subsidiary was established in the Netherlands; it would later become known as Bel Nederland (Bel Netherlands). The following year, in 1968, Les Fromageries Picon merged with the company.

By 1970, a new subsidiary was established in the United States. Two years later, in 1972, it acquired Samos and launched Sylphide. The following year, in 1973, it acquired Crowson in the United Kingdom, later to become known as Bel UK. That same year, it also established a subsidiary in Switzerland, later to become known as Bel Suisse (Bel Switzerland). A year later, in 1974, it established a subsidiary in Morocco, later known as SIALIM.

In 1976, it acquired the Société anonyme des fermiers réunis (SAFR) and its subsidiaries. By 1977, it acquired an Italian company, later to become known as Bel Cademartori. It also launched Mini Babybel. A year later, in 1978, it acquired another company in Sweden, later to become known as Bel Sverige (Bel Sweden). By 1989, it acquired the Adler company in Germany, later to become known as Bel Adler (Edelcreme).

It then launched the Mini Bonbel in 1990. A year later, in 1991, it acquired the Maredsous company in Belgium. Three years later, in 1994, it acquired the Cademartori company in Italy, later to become known as Bel Cademartori in 2001. It also acquired the Queserías Ibéricas company in Spain. By 1996, it acquired the Lacto Ibérica company in Portugal (Limiano, Terra Nostra) and the Kaukauna company in the United States, later known as Bel Kaukauna.

In 1998, it established a subsidiary in Egypt (Bel Egypt) and acquired the Middle East Food Industry, later known as the Bel Egypt Food Company. It also acquired Kraft Chorzele in Poland, later to become known as Bel Polska (Bel Poland). Additionally, it launched Mini Babybel in Maasdam. By 2000, it acquired the Zeletavska Syrarna company in the Czech Republic (Zeletava, Apetitto) and the Zempmilk company in Slovakia (Karicka). The following year, in 2001, it established a subsidiary in Algeria, known as Bel Algeria.

A year later, in 2002, it acquired the assets of Merkts and Owl's Nest through its United States based subsidiary, Bel Kaukauna.

It also acquired Syrokrem in Slovakia and established subsidiaries in Greece (Bel Hellas Cheese Company) and in Tunisia (Bel Tunisia). Additionally, it terminated the production of soft cheese by the SAFR. It also acquired the Dutch Leerdammer Group and its European subsidiaries based in Germany, France, Italy, the United Kingdom, Belgium and the Czech Republic. It also acquired Fromagerie Boursin from Unilever.

In 2003, it terminated the activities of Manchego through its Queserías Ibéricas subsidiary. Two years later, in 2005, it terminated the activities carried out under the Cademartori brand. Meanwhile, it established subsidiary in Syria, known as Bel Syria. By 2009, it changed its logo. In 2015, it acquired 70% of Safilait, a cheese company in Morocco.

Bel Group brands

 Adler-Edelcrème
 Apéricube (PartyCubes, Belcube, Cheese&Fun) (1960)
 Babybel (1952, full size; 1977, mini)
 Bonbel (1947)
 Boursin (2007)
 Cantadou
 Cousteron
 Karička
 Karper (2006)
 Kaukauna
 Kiri (1966)
 (Laughing Cow -> see The Laughing Cow)
 Leerdammer (2002)
 Limiano
 Maredsous
 Merkts
 Picon
 Port Salut
 Price's
 Régal Picon
 Smetanito / Želatava
 Sylphide
 Syrokrém
 Terra Nostra
 Toastinette
 The Laughing Cow (1921)
 Le Véritable Port Salut (1950)
 Wispride

Bel's corporate foundation

Bel's Corporate Foundation was created in May 2008 by the Bel group and its reference shareholder, Unibel. The Bel Foundation was created to promote a balanced diet and preserving the environment, as far as it is required for a healthy diet. Rather than support big initiatives, the Foundation supports a number of projects around the world.

Lab'Bel

Lab’Bel is Bel's Art Laboratory, inaugurated in the spring of 2010, and sponsored by the Group and its main shareholder, Unibel. Heading up Lab’Bel are artist Laurent Fiévet, a member of the Bel family, and Silvia Guerra, an art critic and exhibit curator.

Since its founding, Bel has supported artists such as illustrators Benjamin Rabier, who designed the Laughing Cow, Francisque Poulbot, known for his iconic drawings of Parisian children, and celebrated animator Paul Grimault. Bel sponsors a museum dedicated to its legendary cow – La Maison de La vache qui rit (The Laughing Cow Museum), in Lons-le-Saunier – which also houses special events hosted by Lab’Bel.

See also

 List of cheesemakers

References

External links
 Le Groupe Bel
 Fondation Bel

Cheesemakers
Dairy products companies of France
French brands
Food and drink companies established in 1865
Companies based in Île-de-France
French companies established in 1865